Euryspongia is a genus of sponges belonging to the family Dysideidae.

The species of this genus are found in Indian and Pacific Ocean.

Species:

Euryspongia arenaria 
Euryspongia canalis
Euryspongia coerulea 
Euryspongia coreana 
Euryspongia delicatula 
Euryspongia flabellum 
Euryspongia heroni 
Euryspongia lactea 
Euryspongia lankesteri 
Euryspongia linea 
Euryspongia lobata 
Euryspongia phlogera 
Euryspongia radicula 
Euryspongia raouchensis 
Euryspongia regularis 
Euryspongia rosea 
Euryspongia semicanalis 
Euryspongia spina

References

Sponges